= Hypophloeus =

Scientific classification
- Domain: Eukaryota
- Kingdom: Animalia
- Phylum: Arthropoda
- Class: Insecta
- Order: Coleoptera
- Suborder: Polyphaga
- Infraorder: Cucujiformia
- Family: Tenebrionidae
- Genus: Hypophloeus

Genus of beetles

Hypophloeus is a genus of beetles belonging to the family Tenebrionidae.

Species:

- Hypophloeus maehleri Kulzer, 1956
